The Mayor of the City of Ocean City is the head of the executive branch of government of Ocean City, New Jersey, United States. 

Since Ocean City was chartered as a borough in 1884, 22 individuals have held the office of mayor. Four mayors served two or more non-consecutive terms. Gainer P. Moore was the inaugural mayor of the city, and served on three separate occasions for a total of ten years. The current mayor is Jay Gillian, who won in an open race in May 2010, and in subsequent re-election races in 2014, 2018, and 2022.

History
Beginning in 1879, when the Lake Brothers founded a Christian retreat on the island, the Ocean City Association handled official business, which continued in this capacity until 1884. Based on a referendum on April 30, 1884, the borough of Ocean City was formed from portions of Upper Township, following an act of the New Jersey Legislature on May 3, 1884. At this time, the town was run by a mayor and four members of a City Council. On March 31, 1890, the borough of Ocean City was reincorporated. On March 25, 1897, Ocean City was again reincorporated, this time as a city. At this time, the City Council expanded to six members. In 1911, Ocean City switched to a city commission government, in which voters picked three commissioners, with one designated as mayor. On July 1, 1978, Ocean City switched to a mayor–council form of government, in which there are seven council members, and a directly-elected mayor.

Mayors

Higher offices held
The following is a list of higher public offices held by mayors, before or after their mayoral term(s).

References

Ocean City, New Jersey
O